Jessica St. Clair is an American actress and improvisational comedian from the Upright Citizens Brigade Theatre. With frequent collaborator Lennon Parham, she co-created and co-starred in NBC's Best Friends Forever and USA Network's Playing House.

Life and career
St. Clair was born in Princeton, New Jersey and raised in Westfield, New Jersey, where she attended Westfield High School, graduating as part of the class of 1994. She is a graduate of Middlebury College and a former classmate of fellow Upright Citizens Brigade performer Jason Mantzoukas. She began her comedy career as a regular improviser and sketch performer at the Upright Citizens Brigade Theatre in New York and Los Angeles, originally as a member of the improv team "Mother". Her first major television work was as a regular panelist on the VH1 series Best Week Ever, offering comedic insights on pop culture and the news of the week. She co-starred in the short-lived ABC sitcom In the Motherhood in 2009.

St. Clair has gained notice for her frequent guest appearances (often alongside performing partner Lennon Parham) on podcasts such as Comedy Bang! Bang!, in which she plays the show's teenage intern Marissa Wompler. In 2015, St. Clair and Parham spun off their characters in a new Earwolf podcast called WOMP It Up!, with St. Clair as host Marissa Wompler and Parham co-hosting as Marissa's teacher Miss Listler. Frequent guests on the podcast include Brian Huskey as Marissa's stepdad Seth and Jason Mantzoukas as Marissa's former flame Eric "Gutterballs" Gutterman. The podcast ran through the summer of 2015, returning after a hiatus on November 16, 2015.

St. Clair and Parham created and starred in the NBC comedy series Best Friends Forever, which premiered on April 4, 2012 and aired for one season, followed by Playing House, which premiered on USA on April 29, 2014 and concluded its third and final season in July 2017.

St. Clair has played recurring roles on television shows such as Veep, Weeds, The McCarthys, Marry Me, American Housewife, Worst Week and United States of Tara. She also played the role of Suzanne, the long-suffering wife of host Forrest MacNeil on the Comedy Central series Review. St. Clair's notable work in film includes supporting roles in Bridesmaids, She's Out of My League, Afternoon Delight and Enough Said.

St. Clair had a recurring role on the Netflix comedy series Space Force as structural engineer and civil contractor Kelly King.

Personal life
St. Clair is married to playwright and poet Dan O'Brien. They have a daughter, Isobel Kelly O'Brien.

In 2015, St. Clair said that she and Lennon Parham had both learned Transcendental Meditation. In 2017, St. Clair revealed that she had undergone treatment for breast cancer after being diagnosed in September 2015, and this was incorporated into the third season of Playing House when her character Emma was similarly diagnosed.

Filmography

References

External links

Living people
21st-century American actresses
Actresses from New Jersey
American film actresses
American women podcasters
American podcasters
American television actresses
American women television producers
American television writers
American voice actresses
American women comedians
Middlebury College alumni
People from Princeton, New Jersey
People from Westfield, New Jersey
American women television writers
Upright Citizens Brigade Theater performers
Westfield High School (New Jersey) alumni
Screenwriters from New Jersey
21st-century American comedians
21st-century American screenwriters
Television producers from New Jersey
Year of birth missing (living people)